Cassian may refer to:

Places
Cassian, Wisconsin

People

Historical 
St. Cassian of Imola (4th-century–363), Christian martyr
St. Cassian of Autun (died 350), Christian bishop of Autun
St. John Cassian the ascetic (360–435), French Christian saint and author
St. Marcellus the Centurion, martyr of Tingis, sometimes called "Cassian"
Cassian Sakowicz (1578–1647), Orthodox activist and, later, a Catholic theologian, writer, and polemicist
Cassian of Tangier (3rd-century–298), Christian saint

Modern 
Cassian Elwes (born 1959), British film producer
Ed Cassian (1867–1918), former Major League Baseball player
George Cassian, (1932-1979) Canadian yacht designer
Nina Cassian (1924–2014), Romanian writer
Brigant Cassian (1889–1957), priest and education worker in Hong Kong

In fiction 
Cassian Andor, a character in the Star Wars franchise film Rogue One 

Cassian, a character in Sarah J. Maas's series “A Court of Thorns and Roses”

Other uses 
Cassian (stage), a geochronologic name in Italian stratigraphy
Sabinian school, known as the Cassians
A 1942 GRT tanker owned by Panama and named SS Cassian Sailor from 1956 to 1960